The Bay Cycle Way is an  cycling route around Morecambe Bay in Lancashire and Cumbria in north west England. Most of it forms National Cycle Route 700 (NCN 700), while other sections are waymarked as NCN 6 (London to the Lake District), NCN 69 (Hest Bank to Cleethorpes) and NCN 70 (Walney to Sunderland).

It has been recommended by The Daily Telegraph ("20 amazing ways to enjoy the English seaside this summer"), the i newspaper ("20 best cycle routes in the UK: from coastal pathways to woodland rides") and the Touring Club Italiano ("Inghilterra, Scozia e Galles in bicicletta, le ciclabili più belle per una vacanza green").

Route
The end points of the route are Walney Island, west of Barrow-in-Furness, and Glasson Dock, a  former port on the River Lune south west of Lancaster. The route goes inland to Milnthorpe to cross the River Kent at Levens Bridge, near Levens Hall, the lowest crossing point of the river by road; there are hopes that a footpath and cycleway may some time be installed alongside the railway viaduct which crosses the river at Arnside, further downstream.  99.0% of the road is on asphalt roads or paths, and 28.2% is on traffic-free paths. There are said to be three "challenging climbs": leaving Ulverston, ascending Bigland Hill (between Bigland Tarn and Bigland Barrow, north of Cartmel) and Warton Crag. The total ascent has been calculated to be .

The route passes through:

Walney Island
Barrow-in-Furness
Rampside 
Roosebeck
Ulverston
Greenodd
Cartmel
Cark
Flookburgh
Grange-over-Sands
River Kent crossing at Levens Bridge 
Arnside
Silverdale
Carnforth (outskirts)
Hest Bank
Morecambe
Lancaster
Glasson Dock

References

Further reading

External links
Map of route from Sustrans and Ordnance Survey
Description including elevation profile

Cycleways in England
National Cycle Routes
Transport in Cumbria
Transport in the City of Lancaster